The 7th Filmfare Awards were held in 1960.

Anari won 5 awards, including Best Actor (for Raj Kapoor) and Best Supporting Actress (for Lalita Pawar), thus becoming the most-awarded film at the ceremony.

Main Awards

Best Film
Sujata

Best Director
Bimal Roy – Sujata

Best Actor
Raj Kapoor – Anari

Best Actress
Nutan – Sujata

Best Supporting Actor – Male
Manmohan Krishna – Dhool Ka Phool

Best Supporting Actor – Female
Lalita Pawar – Anari

Best Music Director 
Shankar Jaikishan – Anari

Best Lyricist
Shailendra – Anari for "Sab Kuch Seekha Humne"

Best Playback Singer
Mukesh – Anari for "Sab Kuch Seekha Humne"

Technical Awards

Best Cinematography
V.K. Murthy for Kaagaz Ke Phool

Best Art Direction
M.R. Acharekar for Kaagaz Ke Phool

Best Dialogue
Ramanand Sagar for Paigham

See also
Filmfare Awards

References

External links
 7th Filmfare awards

Filmfare Awards
Filmfare
1960 in Indian cinema